Fernando Gabriel Arce (born 1 May 1995) is an Argentine professional footballer who plays as a centre-forward for Talleres (RdE).

Career
Arce had spells in the youth systems of CEFAR, Godoy Cruz, Gutiérrez and Independiente. His senior career started with Independiente. In January 2016, Arce joined Primera B Nacional's Gimnasia y Esgrima on loan. He made his professional debut on 28 February versus Almagro, before scoring his first goal in his following appearance against Estudiantes (SL). In total, he played twenty-four times and scored one goal in two seasons with Gimnasia y Esgrima. On 25 January 2018, Arce was loaned to United Soccer League's Tulsa Roughnecks. His first game arrived on 18 March vs. Oklahoma City Energy.

After one goal, versus Phoenix Rising, in eight games for Tulsa Roughnecks, Arce moved to Estudiantes from Independiente in June 2018. He subsequently netted one goal in twelve appearances as they won promotion to Primera B Nacional, though his contract wasn't renewed at the conclusion of the season. Arce then agreed to join Flandria on 17 June 2019. His bow came on 16 August against Argentino.

Career statistics
.

References

External links

1995 births
Living people
Sportspeople from Mendoza Province
Argentine footballers
Association football forwards
Argentine expatriate footballers
Expatriate soccer players in the United States
Argentine expatriate sportspeople in the United States
Argentine Primera División players
Primera Nacional players
USL Championship players
Primera B Metropolitana players
Club Atlético Independiente footballers
Gimnasia y Esgrima de Jujuy footballers
FC Tulsa players
Estudiantes de Buenos Aires footballers
Flandria footballers
Talleres de Remedios de Escalada footballers